Saint-Julien-Gaulène (Languedocien: Sent Julian e Gaulena) is a commune in the Tarn department in southern France.

Ernest Nègre (born 11 October 1907 in Saint-Julien-Gaulène, died 15 April 2000 in Toulouse) was a French toponymist.

See also
Communes of the Tarn department

References

Communes of Tarn (department)